Hoshigaoka Station is the name of two train stations in Japan:

 Hoshigaoka Station (Nagoya) in Nagoya, Aichi Prefecture.
 Hoshigaoka Station (Osaka)